This is a list of elections in Canada in 2012. Included are provincial, municipal and federal elections, by-elections on any level, referendums and party leadership races at any level.

January to April
January 16 - North Glengarry, Ontario mayoral by-election
February 27
2012 Hinton, Alberta municipal by-election
Yellowhead County, Alberta municipal by-election, 2012
March 19 - Federal by-election in Toronto—Danforth
March 24 - 2012 New Democratic Party leadership election
March 26 - Rocky View County, Alberta municipal by-election, 2012
April 23
2012 Alberta general election
2012 Alberta Senate nominee election

May to August
May 1 - 2012 Stony Plain municipal by-election
May 14 - 2012 New Brunswick municipal elections
June 11 – Argenteuil and LaFontaine by-elections
June 25 - Rothesay by-election

September to December
September 4 
 Fort Whyte by-election
 2012 Quebec general election
September 6 - Kitchener—Waterloo and Vaughan by-elections
October 15
Iqaluit municipal election, 2012
Northwest Territories municipal elections, 2012 (taxed communities)
October 18 - Yukon municipal elections, 2012
October 20 - 2012 Nova Scotia municipal elections
October 24 - 2012 Saskatchewan municipal elections (urban municipalities)
October 27 - 2012 New Brunswick Liberal Association leadership election
November 3 - 2012 Green Party of Prince Edward Island leadership election
November 5 - 2012 Prince Edward Island municipal elections, excluding Charlottetown, Cornwall, Stratford and Summerside
November 7 - 2012 Saskatchewan municipal elections (odd-numbered rural municipalities)
November 11 - Municipal by-election in Rivière-des-Prairies, Montreal
November 26 - Federal by-elections in Calgary Centre, Durham, and Victoria
December 3 - Nunavut municipal elections, 2012 (hamlets)
December 10 - Northwest Territories municipal elections, 2012 (hamlets)

References

See also
Municipal elections in Canada
Elections in Canada

 
Political timelines of the 2010s by year